Silyl enol ethers in organic chemistry are a class of organic compounds that share a common functional group composed of an enolate bonded through its oxygen end to an organosilicon group. They are important intermediates in organic synthesis.

Synthesis
Silyl enol ethers are generally prepared by reacting an enolizable carbonyl compound with a silyl electrophile and a base, or just reacting an enolate with a silyl electrophile. Since silyl electrophiles are hard and silicon-oxygen bonds are very strong, the oxygen (of the carbonyl compound or enolate) acts as the nucleophile to form a Si-O single bond.

The most commonly used silyl electrophile is trimethylsilyl chloride. To increase the rate of reaction, trimethylsilyl triflate may also be used in the place of trimethylsilyl chloride as a more electrophilic substrate.

When using an unsymmetrical enolizable carbonyl compound as a substrate, the choice of reaction conditions can help control whether the kinetic or thermodynamic silyl enol ether is preferentially formed. For instance, when using lithium diisopropylamide (LDA), a strong and sterically hindered base, at low temperature (e.g., -78℃), the kinetic silyl enol ether (with a less substituted double bond) preferentially forms due to sterics. When using triethylamine, a weak base, the thermodynamic silyl enol ether (with a more substituted double bond) is preferred.

Alternatively, a rather exotic way of generating silyl enol ethers is via the Brook rearrangement of appropriate substrates.

Reactions

General reaction profile 
Silyl enol ethers are neutral, mild nucleophiles (milder than enamines) that react with good electrophiles such as aldehydes (with Lewis acid catalysis) and carbocations. Silyl enol ethers are stable enough to be isolated, but are usually used immediately after synthesis.

Generation of lithium enolate 
Lithium enolates, one of the precursors to silyl enol ethers, can also be generated from silyl enol ethers using methyllithium. The reaction occurs via nucleophilic substitution at the silicon of the silyl enol ether, producing the lithium enolate and tetramethylsilane.

C–C bond formation 
Silyl enol ethers are used in many reactions resulting in alkylation, e.g., Mukaiyama aldol addition, Michael reactions, and Lewis-acid-catalyzed reactions with SN1-reactive electrophiles (e.g., tertiary, allylic, or benzylic alkyl halides). Alkylation of silyl enol ethers is especially efficient with tertiary alkyl halides, which form stable carbocations in the presence of Lewis acids like TiCl4 or SnCl4.

Halogenation and oxidations
Halogenation of silyl enol ethers gives haloketones.

Acyloins form upon organic oxidation with an electrophilic source of oxygen such as an oxaziridine or mCPBA.

In the Saegusa–Ito oxidation, certain silyl enol ethers are oxidized to enones with palladium(II) acetate.

Sulfenylation 
Reacting a silyl enol ether with PhSCl, a good and soft electrophile, provides a carbonyl compound sulfenylated at an alpha carbon. In this reaction, the trimethylsilyl group of the silyl enol ether is removed by the chloride ion released from the PhSCl upon attack of its electrophilic sulfur atom.

Hydrolysis 
Hydrolysis of a silyl enol ether results in the formation of a carbonyl compound and a disiloxane. In this reaction, water acts as an oxygen nucleophile and attacks the silicon of the silyl enol ether. This leads to the formation of the carbonyl compound and a trimethylsilanol intermediate that undergoes nucleophilic substitution at silicon (by another trimethylsilanol) to give the disiloxane.

Ring contraction

Cyclic silyl enol ethers undergo regiocontrolled one-carbon ring contractions. These reactions employ electron-deficient sulfonyl azides, which undergo chemoselective, uncatalyzed [3+2] cycloaddition to the silyl enol ether, followed by loss of dinitrogen, and alkyl migration to give ring-contracted products in good yield. These reactions may be directed by substrate stereochemistry, giving rise to stereoselective ring-contracted product formation.

Silyl ketene acetals
Silyl enol ethers of esters or carboxylic acids are called silyl ketene acetals. These compounds are more nucleophilic than the silyl enol ethers of ketones.

References

Functional groups
Organosilicon compounds
Ethers
Alkene derivatives
Silanes